Erigeron sceptrifer is a North American species of flowering plant in the family Asteraceae known by the common name scepter-bearing fleabane. It has been found in northern Mexico (Chihuahua, Sonora, San Luis Potosí) and the southeastern United States (Cochise County in Arizona).

Erigeron sceptrifer grows in grasslands, frequently alongside widely spaced pine, oak, and juniper trees. It is an annual herb up to 80 cm (32 inches) tall, forming a thin taproot. The inflorescence generally contains 20–50 flower heads in a loose array. Each head can sometimes contain as many as 195 white ray florets surrounding many yellow disc florets.

References

External links
Photo of herbarium specimen at Missouri Botanical Garden, collected in  Chihuahua in 1981, isotype of Erigeron sceptrifer

sceptrifer
Flora of Arizona
Flora of Mexico
Plants described in 1990